Brandon Peterson (born 22 September 1994) is a South African soccer player who plays as a goalkeeper for Kaizer Chiefs in the Premier Soccer League.

References

1994 births
Living people
Soccer players from Cape Town
Cape Coloureds
South African soccer players
Association football goalkeepers
Cape Town Spurs F.C. players
Bidvest Wits F.C. players
Kaizer Chiefs F.C. players
South African Premier Division players
National First Division players